The Golden Cream of the Country is the 12th album by Jerry Lee Lewis. It was released by the Sun Record Company in 1969.

Background
In June 1969, Sun Records founder Sam Phillips sold the entire Sun catalog to Shelby Singleton which included a treasure trove of unreleased Lewis recordings.  With Jerry Lee's rebirth as a country star for Smash Records, Singleton began releasing these older songs and packaged them in such a way that many buyers assumed they were recent recordings.  Under the terms of the deal between Singleton and Phillips, the Sun International Corporation was formed with Phillips as a minority share holder, ensuring that Phillips would continue to get a piece of the pie and that the Sun name would remain relevant.  As Colin Escott observes in his essay for the 1986 retrospective The Killer: The Smash/Mercury Years, "After only seeing two Sun albums by Jerry Lee Lewis between 1957 and 1969, the market was suddenly flooded with three or four a year and even more recycled into budget compilations on Pickwick Records."  Consequently, Lewis found himself competing with his own past. Much like Johnny Cash, his masters had also been a part of the Singleton/Phillips deal.  Singleton would milk these unreleased recordings for years following The Golden Cream of the Country with A Taste of Country later in 1970.

"The Killer" was so hot in 1970 that Singleton issued one of Lewis's latter unreleased Sun recordings, "One Minute Past Eternity", as a single and it climbed to number two on the country chart, following on the heels of Lewis's recent Mercury smash "She Even Woke Me Up to Say Goodbye".  The album also includes two songs by Hank Williams, one of Lewis's biggest influences, as well as the George Jones-penned "Seasons of My Heart," which Jerry Lee performs as a duet with his sister Linda Gail Lewis.

Track listing

1970 compilation albums
Jerry Lee Lewis albums
Sun Records albums